Arkansas held a general election on November 6, 1934. Held during a midterm year, the state did not vote for President or Senate in 1934. For the United States House of Representatives, each of Arkansas's seven Representatives sought re-election. Only David Delano Glover in the Arkansas 6th was challenged in the Democratic primary, he was defeated by John McClellan. Claude A. Fuller and Tilman B. Parks handily defeated Republican and Independent challengers for the Arkansas 3rd and Arkansas 7th, respectively. 

All of Arkansas's statewide constitutional offices were up for reelection, including governor. During the Solid South, the Democratic Party held firm control of virtually every office in The South, including Arkansas. Winning the Democratic primary was considered tantamount to election, with several different factions of the party battling in the open primaries. Incumbent governor Junius Marion Futrell handily won re-election; all other state constitutional offices were held by the Democrats without general election opposition.

Federal

United States House

State

Governor

Lieutenant Governor
Lee Cazort won reelection as Lieutenant Governor of Arkansas unopposed in the Democratic primary or general election.

Constitutional offices

Attorney General
Incumbent Hal L. Norwood was defeated in the Democratic primary by Carl E. Bailey, prosecuting attorney for the Sixth Judicial District of Arkansas. 

Bailey won the seat unopposed in the general election.

Secretary of State
Ed F. McDonald defeated challenger Crip Hall in the Democratic primary.

McDonald won reelection as Arkansas Secretary of State unopposed in the general election.

Auditor
J. Oscar Humphrey defeated challengers Charlie Parker and R. W. Parrish in the Democratic primary.
 

Humphrey won reelection as Arkansas Auditor of State unopposed in the general election.

Treasurer
Incumbent Roy V. Leonard was defeated in the Democratic primary by Earl Page.

Page won election as Arkansas Treasurer of State unopposed in the general election.

State Land Commissioner
George W. Neal won reelection as Arkansas State Land Commissioner unopposed in the Democratic primary or general election.

See also

References

 
1934